JLS is the debut studio album by English boy band JLS. It was released in the UK on 9 November 2009 by Epic Records. It was preceded by the lead single, "Beat Again" on 13 July 2009. The album debuted at number-one in the UK and Ireland. It has been certified four times platinum in the UK, where it was the sixth best-selling album of 2009.

In the US, the album was issued as a six track EP featuring their three UK singles, their new single "The Club Is Alive" and two other tracks from the UK version of the album. This version was released on 2 August 2010,

Singles
 "Beat Again" was the debut release by the band, following their success on the fifth series of The X Factor in 2008. The song was especially successful on the UK Singles Chart, debuting at number, selling 106,299 copies in its first week. The single became the second fastest-selling single of 2009, behind "Bonkers" by Dizzee Rascal. It has sold over 500,000 copies in the UK.
 "Everybody in Love" was released as the second single from the album. On 8 November 2009, the song topped the UK Singles Chart, by selling over 121,000 copies in one week. It has sold over 400,000 copies in the UK, The single was released in February 2010 in the United States, but failed to chart.
 "One Shot" was released as the third and final single from the album on 22 February 2010. The song has peaked in the UK Singles Chart at number six. It has sold over 300,000 copies in the UK.

Reception

Commercial performance
The album debuted at number one on the Irish Albums Chart on 12 November 2009. In the UK, the band beat Robbie Williams to the number-one spot on 15 November 2009. Both JLS and Williams's tenth solo album Reality Killed the Video Star sold over 200,000 copies, making them the fastest-selling albums of the year. JLS beat Williams to the top spot by a margin of less than 1% First week sales were reported to be more than 230,000 copies; it was later revealed that JLS had first-week sales of 239,643, compared to 238,126 for Reality Killed the Video Star, meaning that Williams had lost out by just 1,517 copies, or 0.64%.

The album has been certified two times platinum in Ireland, while being certified four times Platinum in the UK, and was the sixth best-selling album of 2009 in the UK. The album was also the 35th best-selling album of 2010, selling 317,000 copies of the album that year. The album has sold 1.4 million copies in total in the UK as of December 2012.

Critical reception

The album received generally negative reviews from critics on release. It scored an average of 2.7/10 at aggregator website AnyDecentMusic?, which is the lowest score in the history of the website.

Track listing

Charts and certifications

Charts

Certifications

Release history

References

2009 albums
Epic Records albums
Albums produced by Cutfather
Albums produced by Fraser T. Smith
Albums produced by J. R. Rotem
JLS albums